Anna Kalinskaya and Viktória Kužmová were the defending champions, but chose not to participate.

Lucie Hradecká and Kristýna Plíšková won the title, defeating Monica Niculescu and Raluca Olaru in the final, 6–2, 6–2.

Seeds

Draw

Draw

References 

 Main draw

Doubles